Baikunthpur is a town, a Nagar Palika and a notified area committee in Koriya District in the state of Chhattisgarh, India. It is the administrative headquarters of Koriya district.

Geography
It has an average elevation of 529 metres (1735 feet).

Demographics
The Baikunthpur Municipality has population of 28,431 of which 14,749 are males while 13,682 are females as per report released by Census India 2011. Baikunthpur has an average literacy rate of 78%, higher than the national average of 59.5%; with 57% of the males and 43% of females literate. 13% of the population is under 6 years of age.

Education
The city has many schools. 

1. Jawahar Navodaya Vidyalaya(JNV)

2. Govt.Model Hr. Sec School, Odgi Naka, baikunthpur, KOREA 

3. Seshan Memorial Higher Secondary School. 

4. The Adarsh Saraswati higher secondary Vidyalaya,

5. Saraswati Shishu Mandir

6. Kendriya Vidyalaya (Centre school), Baikunthpur

7. St. Joseph's English Medium School

8. Indraprasth English Medium School

9. Govt.ramanuj pratap singhdeo p.g.college baikunthpur

10. Govt.naveen Girls college Baikunthpur

11. Govt.Agriculture College Baikunthpur

12. Govt.Model Girls School Baikunthpur

13. Govt.Ramanuj H.s.school Baikunthpur

14. St.Xaviors H.S.School Rampur Baikunthpur

15. Little Millanium School Bhandi, Baikunthpur

16 . Maa Sarveshwary Shishu Mandir (माँ सर्वेश्वरी शिशु मंदिर)

Education Technology
1. This city also has i-Vidyarthi educational and tutoring (coaching) centres with the latest i-Vidyarthi technologies.

2. The journey of EdTech start-up i-Vidyarthi, founded by CEO Aryan in 2021, was started from this city. i-Vidyarthi's current headquarter is also located in this city.

Culture and industry
Coal India has a GM office of SECL in Baikunthpur, (SECL - a wholly owned subsidiary of CIL). This area has rich coal resources with other GM offices and has many profitable coal mines namely Churcha Coalmines.

The journey of EdTech start-up i-Vidyarthi, founded by CEO Aryan in 2021, was started from this city. i-Vidyarthi's current headquarter is also located in this city.

References 

Dr. Sanjay Alung-Chhattisgarh ki Riyaste/Princely states aur Jamindariyaa (Vaibhav Prakashan, Raipur1)
Dr.Sanjay Alung-Chhattisgarh ki Janjaatiyaa/Tribes aur Jatiyaa/Castes (Mansi publication, Delhi6)

Cities and towns in Koriya district